Akole is a city and Taluka in Akole tehsil, Ahmednagar district in the state of Maharashtra, India. Akole is surrounded by the Sahyadri Mountains of Western Ghats, India. Several historical sites in the city honor Akole's connection to the history and culture of Maharashtra.

General Knowledge
 Akole being a tehsil has Vidhan Sabha seat. And is included in Shirdi Lok Sabha constituency. *It is the westernmost part of Ahmednagar district. 
Akole tehsil is full of tourist places so, is a major tourist attraction.

History
 It is believed that lord Rama visited Akole after departing to 14 yrs vanvaas.
King Harishchandra built a fort for his wife Taramati known as Harishchandragad it is located in Akole tehsil.
Great Maratha emperor Shivaji Maharaj visited Vishramgad in Akole after looting Surat and halted here for 30 days for recovery from the exhaustion due to Surat tour.

Geography
Providing views of the Sahyadri range, Ghatghar is also home to the first project of Udanchan Hydro-power, which has a capacity of generating 250 MW.
 Kokan Kada near Harishchandragad is a flat, sharp and deep edge mountainous region.

Points of interest 
Sheshnarayana Temple - biggest temple in sheshnarayan 
Harishchandragad
Ratangad
Bhandardara Dam formerly known as Wilson Dam is a dam built during British Regime.
Kalsubai
Sandhan Valley
Agasti Maharaj Temple place has been mentioned in Ramayana. It is said that Lord Ram visited here during 14 years Vanvas by building a cave. The remains of the cave are still visible. It starts from Agasti Temple till Panchavati, Nashik.

River and irrigational projects
 Pravara River, which is one of the major tributaries of Godavari River, flows through the region. It has both historical and mythological significance.
Mula : This river rises on the eastern slopes of the Sahayadris between Ratangad and Harichandragad. For the first twenty miles, it flows parallel to Pravara, draining the southernmost or Kotul valley of Akole taluka.
 Umbrella Falls, are a local waterfall, which are named for their visual similarity to an umbrella. 
Sheshnarayan Temple, also known as Sheshnarayan temple, was built in 1795, and it is located about  Kumbhefhal akole.
 
Randha Falls is a source of hydroelectricity and is a tourist spot at Bhandardara. This location has also been featured in Bollywood films such as Maine Pyaar Kiya and Raju Chacha.
 Nilwande Dam is a dam built on the Pravara River to provide hydroelectricity generation.

Historical sites
Agasti Rishi Ashram is situated on the banks of the Pravara River. Mentioned in the Ramayana, it is believed that Lord Ram, Lakshman and Sita visited Sage Agastya here, where the Rishi then offered Lord Ram a miraculous arrow which he later used to kill Ravan.

Amruteshwar Temple is located at the entrance of the Ratanwadi village. It is considered to be over 1,200 years old and is dedicated to Lord Shiva as the main deity. The temple itself has been constructed in the Hemadpanthi architectural style, featuring rock carvings on the main shrine.

The Jagdamba Temple is situated at Tahakari village. Another Hemadpanthi temple, Jagdamba features a sculpture of the deity Apsaras. Similar in style to the Khajuraho temples, the main deity of Jagadmba is made of wood. It is one of the most famous temples in the Ahmednagar District of Maharashtra. The Temple is situated on the bank of river Aadhala. The festival of Jagdamba Mata is organized by local people and takes place two times a year: first as the Chaitra Pournima two-day Yatra festival and involves many people from nearby villages and districts who travel to Darshan of Jagdamba; second as the Navratri 9-night festival of Jagdamba Mata to focus on the continuous worship of Goddess Jagdamba. Detailed information about Jagdamba Temple Tahakari can be found at the website www.jagdambatahakari.com.

The Patta Fort is also known as Vishramgad. The Kalseshwar Temple in Kalas Bk near Akole is situated on a mountain surrounded by the Pravara River. Harishchandragad is a point to enjoy trekking.

Shree Gangadhareshwar temple is built in 1782 and hemadpanti style. It was built by Sardar Potnis from Gwalior. Its unique architecture depicting ganga flowing down is must watch. It is built on 30 ft high platform is really a wonder. The flag man holding flag staff, four pillars combination in temple sanctum, elephant, monkey, nandi and the doorway are must see marvels. The temple is situated in Akole town and just 5Mins walking distance from ST stand.

Villages
There are several small and large villages present in the Akole taluka. To name a few: Mehenduri, Rumbhodi, Rajur, Kotul, Lingdev, Lahit Khurd, Dhamangaon Awari, Nawalewadi, Dhumalwadi, Virgaon, Samsherpur, Unchakhadak, Indori, Ambad, Dhamangaon P, Brahmanwada, Sugaon are the major villages in Akole.

Dams

Bhandardara, Nilwande, Pimpalgaon and Adhala dam in Akole taluka.

Places of interest near Akole

Sandhan valley

Sandhan valley, "The Great Canyon" in the Sahyadri ranges which is a combination of a canyon and a valley.
Located near Samrad village in the Akole tehsil of Ahmednagar district, Maharashtra, India, near the fort Ratangad.
Sandhan valley is undoubtedly The Valley of Shadows. Surrounded by mighty and jaw-dropping mountains of Ratangad and Kalsubai,
the valley stands at the height of 4255 ft high above sea level, which is the perfect spot for trekking and other adventure activities.
The trek goes through 200 ft deep and 2 km long gorge carved by water between the narrow walls.
In the ambitious film Tanhaji: The Unsung Warrior, of the Actor Ajay Devgn, the film’s director OmRaut recreated the Sandhan Valley,
where a confrontation between the Mughal army and the Marathas is shown to have taken place.

Mount Kalsubai
 is the highest peak of Maharashtra located in Akole Taluka. The altitude of Mount Kalsubai is 5400 feet. Kalsubai has placed in Sahyadri mountain lines in the western ghat. Mt Kalsubai also called as "Everest of Maharashtra". Goddess Kalsubai Temple is located at the peak of Mt.Kalsubai. Tourists& Mountaineers from across Maharashtra come for trekking.

harishchandragad
The fort is quite ancient. Remnants of Microlithic man have been discovered here. The various Puranas (ancient scriptures) like Matsyapurana, Agnipurana and Skandapurana include many references about Harishchandragad. Its origin is said to have been in the 6th century, during the rule of Kalachuri dynasty. The citadel was built during this era. The various caves probably have been carved out in the 11th century. In these caves are idols of Lord Vishnu. Though the cliffs are named Taramati and Rohidas, they are not related to Ayodhya. Great sage Changdev (one who created the epic Tatvasaar), used to meditate here in the 14th century.

References

Cities and towns in Ahmednagar district